Pedas (English: Spicy) is a mukim in Rembau District, Negeri Sembilan, Malaysia. It has one main street with a police station, a post office and shops. A hot spring is located in the nearby village of Air Panas which is now a water amusement park.

References

Mukims of Negeri Sembilan
Rembau District